Elin Lindqvist, (born 1982 in Tokyo) is a Swedish author. She made her debut as a writer in 2002 with the book "Tokyo Natt".

Bibliography
Tokyo natt (2002)
Tre röda näckrosor (2005)
Facklan - en roman om Leon Larsson (2009)

References

Living people
1982 births
21st-century Swedish women writers
Date of birth missing (living people)